The 1961 USC Trojans baseball team represented the University of Southern California in the 1961 NCAA University Division baseball season. The team was coached Rod Dedeaux in his 20th season.

The Trojans won the College World Series, defeating the Oklahoma State in the championship game. This was the Trojans' third championship.

Roster

Schedule

Awards and honors 
Steve Bach
 All-AAWU First Team

Art Ersepke
 College World Series All-Tournament Team
 All-AAWU First Team

Larry Hankhammer
 College World Series All-Tournament Team

Larry Himes
 College World Series All-Tournament Team
 All-America Second Team
 All-AAWU First Team

William Ryan
 All-America First Team
 College World Series All-Tournament Team
 All-AAWU First Team

Jim Withers
 All-AAWU First Team

References 

USC
USC Trojans baseball seasons
College World Series seasons
NCAA Division I Baseball Championship seasons
Pac-12 Conference baseball champion seasons
USC TRojans